The following is an alphabetical index topics related to the Mexico.

0–8

.mx – Internet country code top-level domain for México

A

Adjacent countries:

Adjacent states, departments, and districts
Arizona (United States)
California (United States)
Corozal (Belize)
Huehuetenango (Guatemala)
New Mexico (United States)
Petén (Guatemala)
El Quiché (Guatemala)
Orange Walk (Belize)
Texas (United States)
Academy of San Carlos, art academy
Acapulco
Adelita, revolutionary corrido
Administrative divisions of México
Afro-Mexican
Agriculture in Mexico
Aguascalientes
Air Force of México
Airports in México
Lucas Alamán
Miguel Alemán Valdés
Ignacio Allende
Miguel Alemán Velasco
Ignacio Manuel Altamirano
Pedro de Alvarado
Juan Álvarez
Americas
North America
Northern America
Islands of México
North Atlantic Ocean
Golfo de México (Gulf of Mexico)
Mar Caribe (Caribbean Sea)
North Pacific Ocean
Golfo de California (Gulf of California)
Felipe Angeles, general
Anti-Mexican sentiment
Sebastian de Aparicio, beatified Franciscan
Architecture of mexico
Area of México
Mariano Arista, politician
Elena Arizmendi Mejia, feminist revolutionary
Army of México
Art in México
Artisans in Mexico, list of
artists in Mexico, list of
Atlas of México
Manuel Ávila Camacho, president of Mexico
Maximino Ávila Camacho, politician
Aztec civilization (Mexica)
Aztec codices
Aztec emperors
Atlas of Mexico
Axolotl

B

Bernardo de Balbuena, poet
Baja California peninsula
Baja California Sur
Baja California
Bank of Mexico (central bank)
Luis Barragán, architect
Battle of Celaya
Battle of Puebla
Battle of San Jacinto
Birds of Mexico
Woodrow Borah, historian
Boroughs of the Mexican Federal District
Bourbon Reforms
Boy's Town, Nuevo Laredo
Nicolás Bravo
Hugo Brehme, photographer
Buddhism in Mexico
Bullfighting (also related to other Spanish-speaking countries)
Anastasio Bustamante, president of Mexico
Carlos María de Bustamante, historian, politician

C

Miguel Cabrera (painter)
Cajemé, Yaqui leader
Calderón, Felipe, president of Mexico
Fanny Calderón de la Barca, nineteenth-century Scottish writer
California missions
Plutarco Elías Calles, president of Mexico, founded of the dominant party in 1929
Campeche
Nellie Campobello
Cancun
Capital of México:  Ciudad de México, Distrito Federal (Mexico City)
Caribbean
Caribbean Community (CARICOM)
Casa del Obrero Mundial
Agustín Casasola
Casasola Archive
Casimiro Castro, artist
Alfonso Caso
Cuauhtémoc Cárdenas, politician
Lázaro Cárdenas, president of Mexico
Caribbean Sea
Venustiano Carranza, president of Mexico, civilian leader of the Constitutionalist faction
Agustín Casasola, photographer
Alfonso Caso
Castas
Caste War of Yucatan
Rosario Castellanos poet, essayist, novelist
Catholic Church in Mexico
Elizabeth Catlett, artist
Celebration of Mexican political anniversaries in 2010
Centralist Republic of Mexico 
Ceramics of Mexico
Chamber of Deputies of México
Chan Santa Cruz, Yucatan
Chapultepec Castle
Chiapas
Chiapas conflict
Chichimeca War
Chihuahua (state)
Chilam Balam
Chimalpahin, Nahua historian
China Poblana
Chinese immigration to Mexico
Chilpancingo
Cinema of México
Ciudad de México, Distrito Federal (Mexico City) – Capital of México
Ciudad Juárez
Ciudad Mier
Francisco Javier Clavijero, Mexican Jesuit historian
Climate of México
Climate change in Mexico
Coahuila
Coat of arms of México
Codex Mendoza
Codex Osuna
Codex Quinatzin
Codex Xolotl
Colegio de Santa Cruz de Tlatelolco
Colima
Colonial Mexico
Colonias of Mexico City
Comarca Lagunera
Commander-in-chief
Communications in México
Ignacio Comonfort
Companies of México
Congress of México
Senate of México
Chamber of Deputies of México
LX Legislature of the Mexican Congress (60th and current legislature)
Conquest of Mexico
Constitution of 1824, established the republic
Constitution of 1857, Liberal constitution
Constitution of 1917, post-Revolution constitution, still in force
Constitution of Apatzingán, 1814
Constitution of México
Constitutionalists
El Corrido de Rosita Alvírez
Hernán Cortés, conqueror of Mexico, held the Marquesado del Valle de Oaxaca
Don Martín Cortés, 2nd Marquis of the Valley of Oaxaca
Martín Cortés (son of doña Marina)
Daniel Cosío Villegas, historian
COVID-19 pandemic 2020
Cozumel
Crime in México
Cristero rebellion, religious conflict of the late 1920s
Cuisine of México
Colhuacan (altepetl)
Cuauhtémoc
Cucaracha, La, revolutionary song
Cuitlahuac
Culiacan
Culture of México

Categories

:Category:Mexico
:Category:Battles of the Mexican Revolution
:Category:Buildings and structures in Mexico
:Category:Communications in Mexico
:Category:Dams in Mexico
:Category:Economy of Mexico
:Category:Education in Mexico
:Category:Environment of Mexico
:Category:Geography of Mexico
:Category:Government of Mexico
:Category:Health in Mexico
:Category:Historians of Mesoamerica
:Category:Historians of Mexico
:Category:Historic center of Mexico City
:Category:History of Mexico
:Category:Images of Mexico
:Category:Infrastructure in Mexico
:Category:Law of Mexico
:Category:Members of El Colegio Nacional (Mexico)
:Category:Mexican culture
:Category:Mexican historians
:Category:Mexican musical instruments
:Category:Mexican people
:Category:Mexico stubs
:Category:Mexico templates
:Category:Mexican Texas
:Category:Mexico-related lists
:Category:Military of Mexico
:Category:Politics of Mexico
:Category:Pueblos Mágicos
:Category:Science and technology in Mexico
:Category:Society of Mexico
:Category:Sport in Mexico
:Category:Transportation in Mexico
:Category:Valley of Mexico
commons:Category:Mexico

D

Day of the Dead, All Soul's Day
Adolfo de la Huerta, interim president of Mexico
Miguel de la Madrid, president of Mexico
Fernando del Paso, novelist
Francisco del Paso y Troncoso, historian
Dolores del Río, actress
Demographics of México
Desagüe, hydraulic project
Félix Díaz (politician), politician, nephew of Porfirio Díaz
Porfirio Díaz, general and president of Mexico
Bernal Díaz del Castillo, conqueror
Gustavo Díaz Ordaz, president of Mexico
Antonio Díaz Soto y Gama, revolutionary
Distrito Federal, federal capital district
Drug war in Mexico
Diego Durán, early Dominican friar
Durango

E

Economic history of México
Economy of Jalisco
Economy of México
Ecoregions in México
Education in Mexico
Ejido
Elections in México:
1988 Mexican general election
1991 Mexican legislative election
1994 Mexican general election
1997 Mexican legislative election
2000 Mexican general election
2003 Mexican elections
2004 Mexican elections
2005 Mexican elections
2006 Mexican elections
2007 Mexican elections
2008 Mexican elections
Electricity sector in Mexico
Encomienda, early colonial labor system
Encyclopedia of Mesoamerican Cultures
Encyclopedia of Mexico
Energy in Mexico
Martín Enríquez de Almanza, viceroy
Environment of Mexico
Manuel A. Esteva
Eugenics in Mexico
Extreme points of Mexico

F

Federal Army
Federal District of México:
Distrito Federal
San Felipe de Jesús, Mexican saint
Female homicides in Ciudad Juarez
Feminism in Mexico
José Joaquín Fernández de Lizardi
Vicente Filisola
First Mexican Empire
First Mexican Republic
Flag of México
Florentine Codex
Ricardo Flores Magón
Football in Mexico
Foreign relations of Mexico
Forests of Mexico
Vicente Fox
Freemasonry in Mexico
French intervention in Mexico
Carlos Fuentes

G

Hermila Galindo, feminist
Bernardo de Gálvez, viceroy
José de Gálvez, visitador general
Manuel Gamio, anthropologist
Pedro de Gante, Franciscan evangelist
María del Refugio García, feminist
Joaquín García Icazbalceta, historian
Tomás Garrido Canabal, radical revolutionary
Gender inequality in Mexico
Geography of México
Geology of Mexico
Charles Gibson (historian)
Eulogio Gillow y Zavalza, Mexican bishop
Glaciers of Mexico
Golfo de California
Golfo de México
Manuel Gómez Morín, National Action Party founder
Manuel Gómez Pedraza, general, president
Abraham González (governor), revolutionary leader
Abraham González Uyeda, politician
José Gorostiza, poet, educator, diplomat
Government of Mexico
Grito de Dolores
Grupo Alexander Bain
Guadalupe Basilica
Guadalajara
Guanajuato, state of Mexico, state capital
Guelaguetza
Guerrero state of Mexico
Vicente Guerrero, insurgent leader
Gulf Coast of Mexico
Gulf of California
Gulf of Mexico
Eulalia Guzmán, archeologist, educator, feminist, writer
Joaquín "El Chapo" Guzmán, narcotrafficker
Nuño de Guzmán, conqueror

H

Handbook of Middle American Indians, major reference work
Salma Hayek
Heads of state
Health care in Mexico
henequen
Miguel Henríquez Guzmán
Hidalgo
Hidalgo y Costilla, Miguel
Highway system of Mexico
Benjamin G. Hill, revolutionary general
"Himno Nacional Mexicano"
Hinduism in Mexico
Historiography of Colonial Mexico
History of democracy in Mexico
History of Mexico
Economic history of Mexico
History of democracy in Mexico
History of the Aztecs
History of the Jews in Mexico
History of Mexico City
History of the Catholic Church in Mexico
History of science and technology in Mexico
Victoriano Huerta
Huexotzinco Codex
Huichol
Human rights in Mexico
Alexander von Humboldt
Human Development Index

I

Immigration to México
Independence in Mexico
Indigenismo
Indigenismo in Mexico
Indigenous languages of Mexico
Indigenous peoples of Mexico
Pedro Infante, actor
Inquisition in Mexico
Institutional Revolutionary Party, major political party
Instituto Nacional de Antropología e Historia
Instituto Nacional Indigenista
Instituto Politécnico Nacional
International Organization for Standardization (ISO)
ISO 3166-1 alpha-2 country code for México: MX
ISO 3166-1 alpha-3 country code for México: MEX
ISO 3166-2:MX region codes for México
Internet in México
Irreligion in Mexico
Irrigation in Mexico
Islam in México
Islands of México
Agustín de Iturbide, independence leader, emperor
Graciela Iturbide, photographer
Ixtapalapa
Ixtlilxochitl I
Ixtlilxochitl II
Fernando de Alva Ixtlilxochitl, Texcocan historian
Iztaccihuatl
Leandro Izaguirre, artist

J

Jalisco
Rubén Jaramillo
Jews in Mexico, History of
Jews in Mexico, List of
Sor Juana Inés de la Cruz
Benito Juárez
Judaism in Mexico
Jumex

K
Friedrich Katz, historian of Mexico
Frieda Kahlo, painter, writer
Guillermo Kahlo, photographer
Alan Knight, historian
Enrique Krauze, historian

L

Pelagio Antonio de Labastida, archbishop
Lake Chapala*
Lake Patzcuaro
Lake Patzcuaro salamander
Lake Texcoco
Lakes in Mexico
William Lamport, would-be king of Mexico
Diego de Landa, Franciscan evangelist
La Reforma, liberal political program
Land reform in Mexico
Languages of Mexico
Bartolomé de Las Casas, defender of human rights 
Latin America
Law enforcement in Mexico
Legislative Palace of San Lázaro
Vicente Leñero
Francisco León de la Barra
Miguel León-Portilla, ethnohistorian
Miguel Lerdo de Tejada
Sebastián Lerdo de Tejada
LGBT rights in Mexico
Liberal Reform
Liberalism in Mexico
Rossy Evelin Lima
José Ives Limantour, finance minister
Claudio Linati, lithographer
Literature of Mexico
La Llorona
James Lockhart (historian), ethnohistorian
Vicente Lombardo Toledano, labor leader
Adolfo López Mateos, president of Mexico
Andrés Manuel López Obrador, president of Mexico
José López Portillo, president of Mexico
Ignacio López Rayón, poet
Ramón López Velarde
Manuel Lozada, revolutionary leader
Lucha libre
Lists related to México:
Diplomatic missions of Mexico
List of airports in Mexico
List of birds of Mexico
List of capitals in Mexico
List of cities in Mexico
List of combatants in the Mexican Revolution
List of companies of Mexico
List of conflicts in Mexico
List of diplomatic missions in Mexico
List of ecoregions in Mexico
List of football clubs in Mexico
List of heads of state of Mexico
List of hospitals in Mexico
List of islands of Mexico
List of journalists and media workers killed in Mexico
List of lakes in Mexico
List of mammals of Mexico
List of Mexican artisans
List of Mexican artists
List of Mexican autopistas
List of Mexican dishes
List of Mexican Federal Highways
List of Mexican municipalities
List of Mexican operas
List of Mexican poets
List of Mexican political parties
List of Mexican railroads
List of Mexican states by area
List of Mexican states by Human Development Index
List of Mexican states by population
List of Mexican telenovelas
List of Mexicans by net worth
List of Mexico-related topics
List of mountains in Mexico
List of museums in Mexico
List of national parks of Mexico
List of political parties in Mexico
List of politicians killed in the Mexican Drug War
List of presidents of Mexico
List of rivers of Mexico
List of sister cities in Mexico
List of Spanish words of Nahuatl origin
List of synagogues in Mexico
List of the highest major mountain peaks of México
List of the most isolated major mountain peaks of México
List of the most prominent mountain peaks of México
List of Ultras in Mexico
List of Viceroys of Mexico
List of volcanoes in Mexico
List of Mexican women artists
List of World Heritage Sites in México
Lists of mountain peaks of México
Most isolated mountain peaks of Mexico
Most prominent mountain peaks of Mexico
Topic outline of Mexico

M

Malinalco
Malinche
Mammals of México
Manila Galleon
Mar Caribe
Mar de Cortés
Mariachi
Marquesado del Valle de Oaxaca, noble title of Cortés
Leonardo Márquez
Fernando Martí
Masonry
Maximato, non-presidential rule by Calles 
Maya civilization
Maya Songs of Dzitbalche
Mayo people
McLane–Ocampo Treaty
Luis de Mena, painter
Juan N. Méndez, interim president of Mexico
Leopoldo Méndez, artist
Sergio Méndez Arceo, liberationist bishop
 Don Antonio de Mendoza, first viceroy of Mexico
Mesoamerica
Mesoamerican chronology
Mesoamerican codices
Mestizo
Metropolitan areas of Mexico
Mexicali
Mexican American
Mexican–American War
Mexican art
Mexican cuisine
Mexican Debt Disclosure Act of 1995
Mexican Dirty War
Mexican Drug War
Mexican Empire (disambiguation)
Mexican Executive Cabinet
Mexican Federal District
Mexican literature
Mexican military ranks
Mexican miracle
Mexican National Guard
Mexican peso
Mexican peso crisis
Mexican Revolution
Mexican rule of Central America
Mexican Stock Exchange
Mexican Studies/Estudios Mexicanos
Mexican War of Independence
Mexican Youth Athenaeum
Mexico (México)
México (state)
Mexico City (Ciudad de México, Distrito Federal) – Capital of México
"Himno Nacional Mexicano"
Michoacán
Military history of Mexico
Military of Mexico
Miguel Miramón
Mixtec codices
Mixtec peoples
Mixtón War
Moctezuma I
Moctezuma II
Isabel Moctezuma, Aztec noblewoman, encomendera
Monasteries on the slopes of Popocatépetl
Alonso de Molina, Franciscan evangelist and linguist
Andrés Molina Enríquez, advocate of land reform
Francisco de Montejo, conqueror of Yucatán
Carlos Monsiváis, Mexican intellectual
Monterrey
José María Luis Mora, 19th c. cleric and liberal intellectual
Morelos, state of Mexico
José María Morelos, priest and independence leader
Luis Morones, 20th c. labor leader
Dwight Morrow, US diplomat, helped end of Cristero war
Toribio de Benavente Motolinia, Franciscan evangelist
Mountain peaks of México
The 9 Highest mountain peaks of México
The 28 Most prominent mountain peaks of México
The 32 Most isolated mountain peaks of México
Pedro Moya de Contreras, archbishop of Mexico
Multipurpose community telecenters
Municipalities of Mexico
Music of Mexico

N

NAFTA, North America Free Trade Act
Nahuas
Nahuatl
National Action Party
National anthem of Mexico
National Guard
National parks of México
National Mexican Rite of Freemasonry
National symbols of Mexico
Navy of Mexico
Nayarit
New Philology, scholarship based on native-language sources
New Spain, colonial Mexico
Nezahualcoyotl, ruler of Texcoco
Nezahualpilli, ruler of Texcoco
North America
North American Free Trade Agreement (NAFTA)
North Atlantic Ocean
North Pacific Ocean
North Temperate Zone and Tropics
Northern America
Northern Hemisphere
Nuevo León

O

Oaxaca, state, state capital
Alvaro Obregón, revolutionary general, president
Melchor Ocampo, politician
Pablo O'Higgins, artist
Cristóbal de Olid
Olmec
Olmec influences on Mesoamerican cultures
Carlos Ometochtzin, Nahua lord of Texoco
Cristóbal de Oñate
Order of the Aztec Eagle
José Clemente Orozco, muralist
Pascual Orozco, revolutionary
Manuel Orozco y Berra, historian
Pascual Ortiz Rubio, president
Otomi people
Our Lady of Guadalupe
Gilberto Owen
Oztoticpac Lands Map of Texcoco

O
 Outline of Mexico

P

Pachuca
Juan de Palafox y Mendoza, 17th c. viceroy and bishop of Puebla
Pancho Villa Expedition
Alberto J. Pani, economist
Pastry War
Pátzcuaro, pueblo mágico
Octavio Paz, Nobel prize winning writer and intellectual
Pemex, Mexican national oil company
Alfredo Rogerio Pérez Bravo, Mexican ambassador to Russia
Roberto V. Pesqueira
Petroleum Nationalization in Mexico
Pico de Orizaba – highest point in México and the seventh most prominent summit on Earth
José María Pino Suárez
Plans in Mexican history
Plan de Agua Prieta
Plan of Ayala
Plan of Ayutla
Plan de Guadalupe
Plan of Iguala
Plan of San Luis Potosí
Plan de Tuxtepec
Joel Poinsett, first U.S. ambassador to Mexico
Poinsettia, "flor de la noche buena" named after Joel Poinsett
Political divisions of Mexico
Political parties in México
Politics of Mexico
Elena Poniatowska, Mexican writer and intellectual
Popocatepetl
Population of Mexico
Porfiriato, period of Mexican history dominated by Porfirio Díaz 1876-1911
Power stations in Mexico
Pre-Columbian Civilizations
President of México
Prostitution in Mexico
Protected areas of Mexico
Public holidays in Mexico
Puebla
Pueblo Mágico

Q
Querétaro
Quetzalcoatl
Quintana Roo
Vasco de Quiroga, early bishop of Michoacan, founder of hospital communities

R

Rail transport in Mexico
Ignacio Ramírez, intellectual
Real del Monte, mining town
Red Battalions
Reform laws
Religion in Mexico
Restored Republic
Restored Republic
Viceroy Revillagigedo
Bernardo Reyes
Rivers of México
Roman Catholicism in Mexico
Roman Catholicism in Mexico, History of

S

Bernardino de Sahagún
Carlos Salinas de Gortari
Raúl Salinas de Gortari
San Cristóbal de las Casas
San Juan de Ulúa
San Luis Potosí
San Miguel de Allende
Antonio López de Santa Anna
Carlos Santana
Science and technology in Mexico
Scouting in Mexico
Seaports in Mexico
Second Mexican Empire
Secretariat of National Defense (directs only the Army, including Air Force)
Secretariat of the Navy (directs only the Navy)
Senate of México
Señor Frog's
Aquiles Serdán
Junípero Serra
Justo Sierra
Justo Sierra O'Reilly
Carlos de Sigüenza y Góngora
Sinaloa
David Alfaro Siqueiros
Carlos Slim
Soldaderas
Solemn Act of the Declaration of Independence of Northern America, Mexican independence
Sonora
Carlos Solórzano
Spain and the Spanish Empire:
Spanish colonization of the Americas
Spanish conquest of the Aztec Empire
Spanish conquest of Yucatán
Spanish language
Special forces of Mexico
Sports in Mexico
States of México
Mexican states by area
Mexican states by Human Development Index
Mexican states by population
Stock Exchange
Manuel de Sumaya
Supreme Court of Justice of the Nation

T

Tabasco
Tamaulipas
Tampico Affair
Tarahumara
William B. Taylor (historian)
Tecomazuchil Formation
Telenovelas
Television in México
Ten Tragic Days
Tenochtitlan
Tepic
Tepoztlán
Tequila
Tequila, Jalisco
Teotihuacán
Terrazas-Creel family
Territorial evolution of Mexico
Tetlepanquetzal, Tepanec king
Texcoco (altepetl)
Timeline of Mexican War of Independence
Timeline of Mexico City
Tizoc
Tlacopan
Tlatelolco (disambiguation)
Tlatelolco Massacre
Tlaxcala
Toltec
Toluca
Topic outline of Mexico
Guillermo del Toro
Fray Juan de Torquemada, Franciscan historian
Tourism in Mexico
Tropic of Cancer
Tropics and North Temperate Zone
Transportation in Mexico
Treaty of Ciudad Juárez
Treaty of Córdoba
Treaty of Guadalupe Hidalgo
Tulancingo
Tzeltal Rebellion of 1712

U

United Mexican States (Estados Unidos Mexicanos)
Federal District of México:
 Distrito Federal
States of México:
 Estado Libre y Soberano de Aguascalientes
 Estado Libre y Soberano de Baja California
 Estado Libre y Soberano de Baja California Sur
 Estado Libre y Soberano de Campeche
 Estado Libre y Soberano de Chiapas
 Estado Libre y Soberano de Chihuahua
 Estado Libre y Soberano de Coahuila de Zaragoza
 Estado Libre y Soberano de Colima
 Estado Libre y Soberano de Durango
 Estado Libre y Soberano de Guanajuato
 Estado Libre y Soberano de Guerrero
 Estado Libre y Soberano de Hidalgo
 Estado Libre y Soberano de Jalisco
 Estado Libre y Soberano de México
 Estado Libre y Soberano de Michoacán de Ocampo
 Estado Libre y Soberano de Morelos
 Estado Libre y Soberano de Nayarit
 Estado Libre y Soberano de Nuevo León
 Estado Libre y Soberano de Oaxaca
 Estado Libre y Soberano de Puebla
 Estado Libre y Soberano de Querétaro
 Estado Libre y Soberano de Quintana Roo
 Estado Libre y Soberano de San Luis Potosí
 Estado Libre y Soberano de Sinaloa
 Estado Libre y Soberano de Sonora
 Estado Libre y Soberano de Tabasco
 Estado Libre y Soberano de Tamaulipas
 Estado Libre y Soberano de Tlaxcala
 Estado Libre y Soberano de Veracruz de Ignacio de la Llave
 Estado Libre y Soberano de Yucatán
 Estado Libre y Soberano de Zacatecas
Unión Catolica Obrera
United Nations founding member state 1945
United States involvement in the Mexican Revolution
United States-México relations
United States occupation of Veracruz
Universidad Iberoamericana
Universidad Nacional Autónoma de México
Uruapan
Uxmal

V

Martín de Valencia, Franciscan evangelist
Valladolid, Yucatán
Valle de Bravo
Eric Van Young, historian of Mexico
José Vasconcelos, intellectual
Fidel Velázquez, labor leader
Vente de Agosto
Veracruz, state, city
Viceroyalty of New Spain
Viceroys of New Spain
Guadalupe Victoria, first president of Mexico
Santiago Vidaurri
Pancho Villa, revolutionary
Cristóbal de Villalpando, painter
Andrea Villarreal, feminist revolutionary
Virgin of Guadalupe
Virgin of Ocotlán
Volcanoes of México

W

War of the Reform
Arturo Warman, anthropologist
Water supply and sanitation in México
Water resources management in Mexico
Western Hemisphere

Henry Lane Wilson
John Womack, historian
Women in the EZLN
Women in Mexico
Women in the Mexican Drug War
Women's suffrage in Mexico
Women artists in Mexico
Women writers in Mexico
Writers in Mexico
World Heritage Sites in México

X

Xicotencatl I
Xicotencatl II
Xicoténcatl, Tabasco
Xicoténcatl Municipality
Xipe Totec, Aztec flayed god
Xochicalco, archeological site
Xochimilco, Nahua community
Xolotl, Aztec deity
Xolotl, Texcocan ruler
Mexico's name (historical explanation of letter "x" in its name)

Y
Gaspar Yanga, rebel slave leader
Yaqui
Charlotte Yazbek, sculptor
York Rite Masons
Ypiranga Incident, Mexican Revolution
Yucatan, Caste War of
Yucatán
Yucatán peninsula
Yucatan, Spanish conquest of

Z

Zacatecas
Emiliano Zapata
Zapatista Army of National Liberation
Zapotec civilization
Zapotec peoples
Lorenzo de Zavala
Silvio Zavala
Ernesto Zedillo
Zimmermann Telegram
Zinacantan
Zócalo
Zona Norte, Tijuana
Juan de Zumárraga, first bishop of Mexico

See also

List of international rankings
Lists of country-related topics
Outline of Mexico
Topic outline of geography
Topic outline of Mexico
Topic outline of North America
United Nations

References

External links

Historians of Mexico
 
Mexico